Manuel Ramírez Fernández de Córdoba (September 29, 1948 – March 23, 2007) was a Spanish journalist. He received his Bachelor of Information Sciences at the Complutense University of Madrid.

Spanish male writers
1948 births
2007 deaths
20th-century Spanish journalists